Playing 'In the Company of Men' ( or ) is a 2003 French drama film directed by Arnaud Desplechin. It was screened in the Un Certain Regard section at the 2003 Cannes Film Festival.

Cast
 Sami Bouajila as Léonard
 Jean-Paul Roussillon as Henri Jurrieu
 Wladimir Yordanoff as Hammer
 László Szabó as Claude Doniol
 Anna Mouglalis as Ophélie
 Bakary Sangaré as Jonas Servun
 Hippolyte Girardot as Willian De Lille
 Anne Consigny as Therese Jurrieu
 Xavier Beja as Laerte

References

External links

2003 films
French drama films
2000s French-language films
2003 drama films
Films directed by Arnaud Desplechin
Films with screenplays by Arnaud Desplechin
Films with screenplays by Edward Bond
2000s French films